Louise Drew (1882 – April 23, 1954, New York City) was an American stage actress.

Life and career

Born into a prominent stage family, Drew was part of the Barrymore family tree of actors. She was educated in both France and the United States. Her mother was stage actress Josephine Baker and her father was the Shakespearean actor John Drew, Jr. (1853–1927), known as "The First Gentleman of the American Stage." She made her Broadway debut in 1901 appearing with her father in The Tyranny of Tears. She shared the stage with her first cousin Academy Award winner Ethel Barrymore in the Broadway production of Her Sister and the revivals Trelawny of the 'Wells' (in 1911) and Alice Sit-by-the-Fire.

Drew married actor Jack Devereaux (1881–1958) in April 1917 before he was called to serve in World War I. He also was an acclaimed Broadway performer before appearing in silent films produced by The Triangle Motion Picture Company. They had one child, Broadway performer and stage manager John Drew Devereaux (1918–1995).

Among Drew's many Broadway appearances were in The Second in Command (co-starring her father), Iris, Lady Rose's Daughter (1903), Whitewashing Julia (1903), Caught in the Rain (not connected with the Charlie Chaplin Keystone short), and as the French Countess in It Pays to Advertise (1914), which subsequently was revived on both stage and film. She appeared with many well-known stars of the era including Virginia Harned, Robert Edeson, Willie Collier and Fay Davis. She retired from the stage after the Broadway run of The Gay Lord Quex (which also featured her father) concluded in December 1917.

She died on April 23, 1954 and is interred at Mount Vernon Cemetery in Philadelphia, Pennsylvania.

References

External links

1882 births
1954 deaths
American stage actresses
Drew, Louise
Burials at Mount Vernon Cemetery (Philadelphia)
20th-century American actresses